The 1940 season was the twenty-ninth season for Santos FC.

References

External links
Official Site 

Santos
1940
1940 in Brazilian football